Privilege Ibiza, originally known as Ku Club (1979–95), is the "world's largest nightclub" according to the Guinness Book of Records, also defined as a superclub with a capacity of 10,000 people and encompassing 6,500 m² (69,940 ft²).

History
The history of Privilege began in the early 1970s when it started out as a restaurant, then expanded to include a bar and a community swimming pool. It was then known as Club San Rafael. In 1979,  the venue was sold to the Real Sociedad footballer José Antonio Santamaría, together with the creative team of Brasilio de Oliviera (founder of La Troya Asesina, one of the White Island's longest running nights) and Gorri. The venue then changed its name to KU, after the name of a God from Hawaiian mythology (see Kū). The appeal of the club was such that it commissioned a medium-length film showcasing the many wonders of Ibizan landscapes and nightlife in the mid-eighties.

Throughout the 1980s, KU Club earned a reputation initially as Europe's premier polysexual but predominately gay nightspot and was compared to an open-air version of the famous Studio 54 in New York. It staged spectacular parties in the main room, which was organized around a swimming pool and a statue of Ku. The place was also where the video to "Barcelona" by Freddie Mercury and Montserrat Caballé was filmed on 30 May 1987. It was the witness to early live performances by groups like Spandau Ballet and Kid Creole and the Coconuts. The club featured in a Channel 4 documentary called “A Short Film about chilling”, which labelled KU as “the mirror of Ibiza”.  A group of fashion designers called Locomía would have shows at KU. After being discovered there, they went on to become a highly successful recording project. The open-air parties came to an end when legislation forced many of the greater clubs in Ibiza to cover their dancefloors in the early 1990s. Nevertheless, the sheer size of the venue gave rise to the claim of it being the size of an aircraft hangar with a 25-meter high roof.

The club continued with the KU Club name until 1995 before becoming known as Privilege, after a change of ownership to Jose Maria Etxaniz. In 1994 it hosted Manumission, one of the island's most famous events. In 1998 La Vaca Asesina moved to Amnesia and was renamed La Troya Asesina. After a dispute between the club owner and Manumission's organizers in 2005 the event ended in 2006. In 2006 La Troya Asesina moved to Space.

Venue
According to official statistics published in the 2003 edition of Guinness World Records Privilege is by far the world's largest nightclub covering an area of 69,968 sq ft (6,500 m2) and holding 10,000 clubbers, Designated areas of the club include the Coco Loco bar area, and the La Vaca dance area (now known as the Vista Club).

Resident DJs  

 Adam Beyer
 Ben Klock
 Carl Cox
 Marcel Dettmann
 Jayda G
 Alex P
 Deborah De Luca
 Dennis Cruz
 Sindey Charles
 The Blessed Madonna
 Young Marco
 Luca Donzelli
 Jamie Jones
 Seb Zito

Live performances
A number of live performances at the venue have included:

 Adamski
 Divine
 Duran Duran
 Carl Cox
 808 State
 Freddie Mercury
 Gloria Gaynor
 Grace Jones
 James Brown
 Kylie Minogue
 José Feliciano
 Kid Creole & The Coconuts
 Orchestral Manoeuvres in the Dark (OMD)
 Spandau Ballet
 Sylvester

Promoters
Notable have included:

 Brasilio de Oliviera.
 Gorri
 Faruk Gandji
 Mike, Claire and Andy Manumission.

Celebrity patrons
The club has attracted many celebrities over the years, including Boy George, Madonna, David Bowie, Grace Jones, Jean Paul Gaultier, Joni Mitchell, Led Zeppelin, Moschino, Tina Turner, and Valentino.

Appearances in popular media
 The club is seen in the online racing game Test Drive Unlimited 2.
 The club is mentioned in the film Kevin & Perry Go Large.

Events staged at Privilege
Include:

 Resistance (2017)
 Afterlife (2017)
 Babylonia
 Brazil
 Calcutta
 Fort Ku
 La Vaca Asesina (1978-2006)
 Manumission (1994-2007)
 Tanga Night
 The Home of Troy
 The Killing Cow
 The Temple of Love
 White Fool Moon

See also
 List of electronic dance music venues
 Superclub
 Amnesia (nightclub)
 Space (Ibiza nightclub)

References

External links

Facebook page about KU Club
Privilege - Ibiza | Club Portrait, DJs & History 

Nightclubs in Ibiza
1970s establishments in Spain
Year of establishment missing
Electronic dance music venues